In psychology and sociology, relationship aspect refers to the quality of interpersonal cooperation in terms of intuitive, emotional and social inner relatedness, which makes people feel connected outside of the content aspect.

Openness, honesty, reliability, emotional intelligence and other key skills are required to develop and deepen a good relationship.

Relevance 
In order for communication processes within familiar or business relationships and especially inside of romantic relationships to succeed, the quality of the relationship aspect is of prime importance. According to Sigmund Freud, trust, empathy, and shared values, along with preconceptions or fears and wishes, determine the success of interpersonal communication by more than 80 percent.

The iceberg model states that the relationship aspect has a much greater impact on communication than the content level, but also that it often works subconsciously.

Social context 
Social competence generally refers to skills needed for social behavior. The term “social” can be understood within the field of social-psychology as “interpersonal”, sociological-value-neutral (as in “societal”) or as sociological-judgmental (as in “social-moral”). It describes the different dimensions of interpersonal relationships. Which interpersonal relationships and mismeetings (Martin Buber) will unfold, which conflicts may develop, and which of the existing conflicts can possibly be solved? Courage, the ability to overcome something, and risk are fundamental traits in developing social skills and stable relationships. Their quality can generally be measured on the basis of the status, power and influence within a social structure as well as the choice of partner.

The ability to develop stable relationships is strongly based on the following features:

 Teamwork
 Knowledge of human nature
 Empathy (compassion)
 Communication skills
 Critical faculties
 Self-confidence
 Cooperation
 Perception

Economic context 
The economic importance of the relationship aspect between employees and colleagues, or customers, or suppliers, becomes clear during business exchange processes, particularly within teams and in the sales area. Since trust is an essential factor for the disposition to engage in monetary exchange processes, considerable efforts are made in this area to secure a defined relationship aspect, with the help of electronic records (see: CRM).

The relationship aspect is of particular importance in the economic context for marketing. The economic importance of personal relationships is in no other sales area of marketing as important as it is here. Consequently, the success of networking depends very much on the number of people one knows and their level of trust. Naturally, these are first and foremost close relatives and good friends. These people are seen as potential customers and future independent employees. Visits to these people are primarily for the purpose of selling products and recruiting them to the business. In this context, aspects of business ethics also play a direct role.

The efforts to establish a mutually beneficial business relationship on the basis of a "good relationship aspect" are represented by various concepts in the spirit of the win-win strategy. The "getting to yes" theory, in particular, aims to make the relationship between the two parties as good as possible and the dispute as clear as necessary (principle: "To separate the people from the problem").

Rhetorical context 
Within the argumentation, the relationship to the use of the relationship aspect is based on emotional arguments which are supported by preconceptions, personal references, experience and the credibility of the speaker. The logically valid deductive reasoning on the other hand completely excludes the relationship aspect between speaker and audience. Since Plato, dialectics has established itself as a school of argumentation. Dialectics aims to promote an inner understanding and willingness to compromise, comprising three stages of development: a thesis, an antithesis and a synthesis.

Conflict resolution 
Another method for solving interpersonal conflicts in the relationship aspect has been successfully established with systemic therapy or systemic organisational development. All people and institutions involved with their needs and expectations, as well as the interactions with each other, are considered neutral. In this way, it is usually possible to clarify the relationship disturbances beyond the pure reasoning approach.

Another form of conflict resolution for a disturbed relationship aspect is mediation. This person mediates between parties in order to find a pragmatic solution, usually a compromise. In contrast to more therapeutically oriented systemic work, mediation is more frequently encountered in business.

From the theoretical background of psychoanalysis, Gestalt therapy and humanistic psychology, a third concept has been established, called theme-centered interaction, which was developed by the educator and psychoanalyst Ruth Cohn to improve relationships within groups. The aim of TCI is to open up better possibilities of communication through understanding interrelationships and through emotional experience. The result is an interaction model that treats the person, the group and the task as a model unit, where each is equally important and where the context of communication is always taken into consideration.

Representation 
The genogram has been established as an instrument for the graphical representation of a bipolar or polypore relationship aspect. Dependencies and informal structures that would be hardly recognizable on the surface can be visualized more easily with the help of graphical relationship lines between the participants. The mediator, the systemic organizational developer, or the therapist uses this image to reduce tension and previously hidden conflicts.

See also 
Transactional analysis
Enneagram of Personality
Rhetoric
Didactic method
Paul Watzlawick#Five basic axioms

External links 
 http://www.wanterfall.com/Communication-Watzlawick%27s-Axioms.htm
 https://behavenet.com/communication-content-and-relationship-aspects

Social psychology
Interpersonal relationships
Interpersonal communication